Souillac may refer to:

Souillac, Lot, a commune in the Lot department, France
Souillac, Mauritius, a village in the district of Savanne, Mauritius